Tamil Nadu, a state in South India, has a highly developed, dense, and modern transportation infrastructure, encompassing both public and private transport. Its capital city, Chennai is well-connected by land, sea, and air and serves as a major hub for entry into South India.

Roadways

Roads in Tamil Nadu 

Tamil Nadu has an extensive road network. The state road network covers about 153 km per 100 km2 area, which is higher than the country's average road network coverage of 103 km per 100 km2 area. A separate Highways Department (HD) was established in April 1946 and the same has been renamed as Highways & Minor Ports Department (HMPD) on 30 October 2008.  HMPD of Tamil Nadu is primarily responsible for construction and maintenance of roads including national highways, state highways and major district roads in Tamil Nadu. It operates through 7 wings namely National Highways Wing, Construction & Maintenance Wing, NABARD and Rural Roads Wing, Projects Wing, Metro Wing, Tamil Nadu Road Sector Project Wing, Investigation and Designs Wing geographically spread across the state in 35 districts with about 120 divisions and 450 subdivisions.

National Highways 

In Tamil Nadu, ‘’National Highways Wing’’ of Highways & Minor Ports Department was established in the year 1971 to look after the works of improving, maintaining and renewing of National Highways laid down by National Highways Authority of India (NHAI). NH 47, NH 49, NH 208 and NH 220 connects Tamil Nadu with Kerala. NH 67, NH 207 and NH 209 connects Tamil Nadu with Karnataka. NH 205, NH 219  and NH 234 connects Tamil Nadu with Andhra Pradesh. NH 4 connects Tamil Nadu with Maharashtra, Karnataka, and Andhra Pradesh. NH 5 connects Tamil Nadu with Orissa and Andhra Pradesh. NH 44 connects Tamil Nadu with Jammu and Kashmir, Punjab, Haryana, Delhi, Uttar Pradesh, Madhya Pradesh, Maharashtra, Andhra Pradesh, and Karnataka. NH 66 connects Tamil Nadu with Karnataka and Puducherry.

State Highways 

Roads which connects district headquarters, important towns and the National Highways in the State and neighboring States are declared as State Highways. Construction & Maintenance wing of Highways Department looks after Construction, Maintenance of all the State Highways (SH), Major District Roads (MDR), Other District Roads (ODR). Tamil Nadu State Highways Network has 7 circles namely Chennai, Tiruvannamalai, Coimbatore, Salem, Trichy, Madurai and Tirunelveli.

Other Roads 
This category includes Major District Roads, Other District Roads (ODR), Rural & Sugarcane Roads and Special Roads such as East Coast Road, Rajiv Gandhi Salai / IT Expressway, Ennore-Manali Road Improvement Project (EMRIP), Chennai Port – Maduravoyal Expressway and Outer Ring Road Project. This Roads provides linkage between production and marketing centers within a district. It also provides connectivity for district & taluk headquarters.

Public Transport 

Tamil Nadu State Transport Corporation (TNSTC) is the public transport bus operator of Tamil Nadu, India. It operates buses along intra and inter state bus routes, as well as city routes. TNSTC is the largest government bus transport corporation in India. There are currently 8 divisions in TNSTC including Metropolitan Transport Corporation in Chennai and State Express Transport Corporation.

State Express Transport Corporation Limited (SETC) formerly known as Thiruvalluvar Transport Corporation runs long-distance express services exceeding 250 km and above throughout the state of Tamil Nadu linking all important capital cities, historical places, religious places and commercial places etc., and adjoining states of Andhra Pradesh, Karnataka, Kerala and the Union Territory of Puducherry. SETC provides advance booking and reservation on all of its routes. SETC operates buses of various classes of services such as semi-deluxe, ultra-deluxe and air-conditioned. CMBT in Chennai, operated by transport department is one of the largest bus stations in Asia.

Private Transport 
Chennai is home to around 35-40% of India's total automobile industry and hence it is known as the Detroit of Asia. It will become one of the world's largest auto hubs by 2016 with a capacity of over 3 million cars annually. Tamil Nadu has over 17.5 million registered vehicles with nearly 730% growth over the last two decades. Private bus services are operated in both short and long haul routes by mofussil bus operators.

Railways 

Tamil Nadu has a good rail network as part of Southern Railway. Headquartered at Chennai, the Southern Railway network extends over a large area of India's Southern Peninsula, covering the states of Tamil Nadu, Kerala, Puducherry, a small portions of Karnataka and Andhra Pradesh. The system connects it with most major cities in India. Main rail junctions in the state include Chennai, Coimbatore, Madurai, Erode, Tiruchirapalli and Salem.

Mass Rapid Transit System 

Chennai, India's fourth-largest urban agglomeration, has a well-established suburban railway network, which dates back to 1931, when services began on the metre-gauge line from Beach to Tambaram. The Mass Rapid Transit System (MRTS) is an elevated line of the urban mass transit system (metro-like cityrail) in Chennai (Madras), India. The line currently runs within city from Chennai Beach (Madras Beach) to Velachery, covering a distance of 25 km with 21 stations. Despite full technical and logical separation from the Chennai Suburban Railway, the MRTS is operated by the state-owned Southern Railway (SR), a zone of Indian Railways.

Chennai Metro 

The Chennai Metro is a rapid transit rail system in the Tamil Nadu capital city of Chennai. The Phase I of the project consisting of two corridors is under construction. The elevated section of the project was scheduled to be operational by 2011 and the entire project was scheduled to be completed by the financial year 2014–2015. About 55% of the corridors in Phase I is underground and the remaining elevated. The project is estimated to cost around 14,600 crore (US$3.17 billion) for the two corridors totaling 55 km.

Airways 
Tamil Nadu has a major international airport Chennai International Airport, which is the fourth busiest airport by passenger traffic and is the third largest cargo hub in India. Other international airports present in the state are Coimbatore International Airport and Tiruchirapalli International Airport. Madurai Airport is a customs airport with limited international flights. Neyveli Airport, Salem Airport and Tuticorin Airport are domestic airports. A new domestic airport is coming up in Vellore. Flights are planned to be introduced under UDAN -II scheme to Vellore, Tanjore And Rameshwaram, the former is an IAF operated airport and the later is an Indian Navy controlled airport. Increased industrial activity has given rise to an increase in passenger traffic as well as freight movement which has been growing at over 18 per cent per year. The holy town of Palani, is an important pilgrimage center of Tamilnadu which attracts pilgrims not only from India but also from abroad. An airport will be a boost to the development of that region. Likewise a proposal is there for an airport in Kanyakumari the southern most tip of peninsular India. Survey has also been conducted for setting up heliports in the famous hill stations of Ooty, Kodaikanal, Yercaud and Valparai which will give a fillip to the tourism industry.

Waterways 

Tamil Nadu has three major seaports at Chennai, Ennore, Thoothukudi. There are 11 other ports. Chennai Port is an artificial harbor situated on the Coromandel coast and is India's second busiest container hub, handling general industrial cargo, automobiles, etc. Ennore Port handles all the coal and ore traffic in Tamil Nadu.

See also

 Transport in India

References

External links 

 
Transport in India by state or union territory